STOC may refer to:

 Serbian True Orthodox Church
 Symposium on Theory of Computing